The 2006–07 Essent Cup of marathon speed skating was held in the Netherlands, between 7 October 2006 and 3 March 2007.

Men's results

Final rankings

Women's results

Final rankings

External links
Official website
Results at knsb.nl
 Essent Cup Finale Schaatspeloton.nl
 Essent Cup Finale Schaatspeloton.nl

Speed skating competitions
2006 in speed skating
2007 in speed skating
Speed skating in the Netherlands
2006 in Dutch sport
2007 in Dutch sport